Federación, Entre Ríos, Argentina
 Federación Department, Argentina
 Federación Municipality, Falcón State, Venezuela